Cheshmeh Anjir-e Firuzabad (also Romanized as Cheshmeh Anjīr-e Fīrūzābād; also known as Cheshmeh Anjīr and Cheshmeh Anjīrī) is a village in Sarrud-e Jonubi Rural District, in the Central District of Boyer-Ahmad County, Kohgiluyeh and Boyer-Ahmad Province, Iran. At the 2006 census, its population was 204, in 49 families.

References 

Populated places in Boyer-Ahmad County